The following are lists of Malayalam films of the 2020s, by year released.

 List of Malayalam films of 2020
 List of Malayalam films of 2021
 List of Malayalam films of 2022
 List of Malayalam films of 2023

See  also
 List of highest-grossing Malayalam films

2020s
Malayalam
Malayalam